Sandro José Ferreira da Silva also known as Sandro (born 19 March 1986) is a Brazilian footballer who plays for Austria Klagenfurt. His former clubs include SK Austria Kärnten, SV Ried, and České Budějovice in the Czech Republic.

References

External links
 
 

1986 births
Living people
Brazilian footballers
F.C. Penafiel players
Esporte Clube Vitória players
CR Vasco da Gama players
SK Austria Kärnten players
SK Dynamo České Budějovice players
SV Ried players
SKN St. Pölten players
Austrian Football Bundesliga players
Czech First League players
Brazilian expatriate footballers
Expatriate footballers in Austria
Expatriate footballers in the Czech Republic
Association football midfielders